Manracosuchus is an extinct genus of dubious crocodylian known from the Early-Middle Eocene Obaylin Formation of Kazakhstan.

Taxonomy
The type species of Manracosuchus, M. isolatus, is known from a fragment of the lower jaw, isolated teeth, scute fragments, and a post-symphysial part of a right dentary. It was subsequently referred to Allognathosuchus by Efimov (1986), but was later restored to its original binomial by Efimov (1993). A 2015 overview of extinct crocodyliforms from the former Soviet Union and adjacent countries treated Manracosuchus as a nomen dubium referable to Crocodylia incertae sedis.

References

Crocodilians
Eocene crocodylomorphs
Eocene reptiles of Asia
Prehistoric pseudosuchian genera
Fossil taxa described in 1984
Nomina dubia